Hot Country Knights is an American country music and parody music band formed by country music singer Dierks Bentley in 2015. The band is composed of Bentley and his own road band. Bentley portrays lead singer Douglas "Doug" Douglason, with the other members of his band performing under the names of Trevor Travis (bass guitar), Marty Ray "Rayro" Roburn (lead guitar),  Terotej "Terry" Dvoraczekynski (fiddle), Barry Van Ricky (steel guitar), and Monte Montgomery (drums). The members of Bentley's road band have also fashioned fictitious backstories for their musical stage names. In 2020, Capitol Records Nashville, the label to which Bentley is signed, also signed Hot Country Knights. The band is intended to be a satirical tribute to country music of the 1990s. Variety described the band as "a full Spinal Tap-like musical-comedy act around the mullet-laden, '90s-spoofing conceit."

The band released its debut single, "Pick Her Up", a duet with Travis Tritt, in January 2020. It was accompanied by a music video starring Tiffani Thiessen. Hot Country Knights performed "Asphalt" on Jimmy Kimmel Live on February 5, 2020.

In February 2020, Bentley announced in-character as Douglason that Hot Country Knights would begin touring starting in April 2020, which would later be postponed due to the COVID-19 pandemic. The band also released a second music video for "Asphalt" at this point. Capitol Records announced that the group's debut album, The K Is Silent, will be released on May 1, 2020. Bentley co-wrote five songs on the album, with other collaborators including Brett Beavers, Jim Beavers, and Jon Nite. Terri Clark sings duet vocals on the track "You Make It Hard".

Discography

Albums

Singles

References

Country music groups from Tennessee
Bands with fictional stage personas
Capitol Records artists
Fictional musical groups
Parody musicians
American parodists